Raymond Finch (born 2 June 1963) is a British politician who served as a Member of the European Parliament (MEP) for South East England between 2014 and 2019.

The fourth named candidate on the UK Independence Party (UKIP) list for the South East England constituency, he was elected as a Member of the European Parliament after the 2014 European Parliamentary Election.

Finch was the leader of the UKIP group on Hampshire County Council, standing down on election to the European Parliament. He resigned as a councillor in January 2017 following his appointment as head of the UK Europe of Freedom and Direct Democracy delegation in the European Parliament.

On 17 April 2019, Finch left UKIP to join the Brexit Party. He was not selected as a Brexit Party candidate for the 2019 European Parliamentary election, and ceased to sit as a Brexit Party MEP on 26 May 2019.

References

1963 births
Living people
UK Independence Party councillors
UK Independence Party MEPs
MEPs for England 2014–2019
Members of Hampshire County Council
Brexit Party MEPs
British Eurosceptics